Amalazari is a village in Taluka Bilagi, district Bagalkot, in the state of Karnataka in India. The population of the village 4011 20 January 2017. Major occupations of the village include agricultural production. Amalazari was named as  one of the most developed villages in Vijayapura and Bagalkot areas. The village of Amalazari is 15 km east of Mudhol and 70 km south of Vijayapura. The village has a primary school and a high school. The village is dominated by the Hindu community. The literacy rate is 90%. Mudhol is the nearest town to Amalazari.

References

Villages in Bagalkot district